Diacylglycerol kinase (DGK or DAGK) is a family of enzymes that catalyzes the conversion of diacylglycerol (DAG) to phosphatidic acid (PA), utilizing ATP as a source of the phosphate. In non-stimulated cells, DGK activity is low, allowing DAG to be used for glycerophospholipid biosynthesis, but on receptor activation of the phosphoinositide pathway, DGK activity increases, driving the conversion of DAG to PA. As both lipids are thought to function as bioactive lipid signaling molecules with distinct cellular targets, DGK therefore occupies an important position, effectively serving as a switch by terminating the signalling of one lipid while simultaneously activating signalling by another.

In bacteria, DGK is very small (13 to 15 kD) membrane protein which seems to contain three transmembrane domains. The best conserved region is a stretch of 12 residues which are located in a cytoplasmic loop between the second and third transmembrane domains. Some Gram-positive bacteria also encode a soluble diacylglycerol kinase capable of reintroducing DAG into the phospholipid biosynthesis pathway. DAG accumulates in Gram-positive bacteria as a result of the transfer of glycerol-1-phosphate moieties from phosphatidylglycerol to lipotechoic acid.

Mammalian DGK Isoforms

Currently, nine members of the DGK family have been cloned and identified. Although all family members have conserved catalytic domains and two cysteine rich domains, they are further classified into five groups according to the presence of additional functional domains and substrate specificity. These are as follows:

 Type 1 - DGK-α, DGK-β, DGK-γ - contain EF-hand motifs and a recoverin homology domain
 Type 2 - DGK-δ, DGK-η - contain a pleckstrin homology domain
 Type 3 - DGK-ε - has specificity for arachidonate-containing DAG
 Type 4 - DGK-ζ, DGK-ι - contain a MARCKS homology domain, ankyrin repeats, a C-terminal nuclear localisation signal, and a PDZ-binding motif.
 Type 5 - DGK-θ - contains a third cysteine-rich domain, a pleckstrin homology domain and a proline rich region

References

External links 
 
 

Integral membrane proteins
EC 2.7.1